West Liberty, Indiana, may refer to:

West Liberty, Howard County, Indiana
West Liberty, Jay County, Indiana